Parkia korom is a species of flowering plant in the family Fabaceae that is endemic to the Federated States of Micronesia.

References

korom
Endemic flora of the Federated States of Micronesia
Vulnerable plants
Taxonomy articles created by Polbot